The North American Meteor Network (NAMN) was established in June 1995 as an electronic social network of people using the Web to share an interest in meteors. With over 600 members, NAMN has three main purposes:

 to recruit amateurs into the ranks of meteor observing
 provide guidance, instructions and training in the methods of meteor observing
 coordinate meteor observations in order to collect useful data for investigating sporadic and meteor shower activity

NAMN publishes a monthly newsletter NAMN Notes and co-sponsors the Global Meteor Observing Forum meteorobs.

See also 
 List of astronomical societies

References 
Recent NAMN Meteor Observations

External links 
Official NAMN Website

Amateur astronomy organizations